The Cavalier's Dream is an 1898 American black-and-white horror silent one minute short film directed by Edwin S. Porter in his directorial debut.

Plot 
A cavalier sits asleep at a bare table; an old witch enters, raps three times, then disappears; the cavalier sees the table spread for a sumptuous repast. Mephistopheles appears, then the old witch, who suddenly shapeshifts into a beautiful young girl. The changes and magical appearances are startling and instantaneous.

References

External links 
 

1898 films
1898 horror films
1898 short films
1890s American films
American supernatural horror films
American black-and-white films
American silent short films
1898 directorial debut films
Films about witchcraft
Demons in film
Films about shapeshifting
Films directed by Edwin S. Porter
Silent horror films